Krisa also known as Krisi   is a village in Bewani-Wutung Onei Rural LLG, Sandaun Province, Papua New Guinea, 20 kilometers south of the provincial capital of Vanimo. In the local language, the village, its people and the local language itself are all known as I'saka.

The traditional language of Krisa is I'saka, but Tok Pisin is the primary language used. English is also known by some.

See also
I'saka language
Pasi, Papua New Guinea

References 

Populated places in Sandaun Province